Alvah Sabin (October 23, 1793 – January 22, 1885) was an American politician and clergyman. He served as a United States representative from Vermont.

Biography
Sabin was born in Georgia, Vermont, to Benjamin Sabin and Polly McMaster Sabin, and was educated in the common schools. He was also a member of the Vermont militia and served during the War of 1812.  Sabin also attended the University of Vermont in Burlington, which awarded him the honorary degree of Master of Arts in 1826.

After the war, Sabin studied theology in Philadelphia and graduated from Columbian College (now George Washington University), Washington, D.C., in 1821. He was ordained a minister and preached at Cambridge, Westfield, and Underhill until 1825, when he returned to Georgia, Vermont. He was pastor of the Georgia Baptist Church for fifty-three years.

Sabin was a member of the Vermont House of Representatives from 1826 to 1835, 1838 to 1840, 1847 to 1849, 1851, 1861 and 1862. He served in the Vermont Senate in 1841, 1843, and 1845. He was the Secretary of State of Vermont in 1841, and served as Probate Judge.  He was a member of the Constitutional; Conventions of 1843 and 1850, and was Assistant Judge of the Franklin County Court from 1846 to 1852.

He was elected as a Whig Party (United States) to the Thirty-third Congress and reelected as an Opposition Party candidate to the Thirty-fourth Congresses, serving from March 4, 1853, to March 3, 1857. While in Congress he served as chairman for the Committee on Revisal and Unfinished Business in the Thirty-fourth Congress. He was not a candidate for renomination in 1856. He served as a delegate to the first Anti-Slavery National Convention, and was the county commissioner of Franklin County, Vermont, in 1861 and 1862, responsible for curbing the buying and selling of alcoholic beverages. He moved to Sycamore, Illinois, in 1867 and continued his ministerial duties.

Family life
Sabin married Anna Mears in 1819. They had five children together, Benjamin F. Sabin, Julia A. Sabin, Harriet Amelia Sabin, Parthenia A. Sabin and Diantha Marie Sabin. Following Anna's death, Sabin later married Susan Marsh.

Death
Sabin died on January 22, 1885, in Sycamore. He is interred at Georgia Plains Cemetery in Georgia Plains, Vermont.

References

Further reading
 "Vermont: the Green mountain state, Volume 3" by Walter Hill Crockett, published by The Century History Company, Inc., 1921.

External links 

 
 govtrack.us: Rep. Alvah Sabin
 Ancestry.com: Alvah Sabin (1793 - 1885)
 The Political Graveyard: Sabin, Alvah (1793–1885)

1793 births
1885 deaths
People from Georgia, Vermont
Baptist ministers from the United States
Whig Party members of the United States House of Representatives from Vermont
19th-century American politicians
Vermont Oppositionists
Opposition Party members of the United States House of Representatives from Vermont
Secretaries of State of Vermont
Vermont state senators
Members of the Vermont House of Representatives
Vermont state court judges
County commissioners in Vermont
Columbian College of Arts and Sciences alumni
People from Sycamore, Illinois
Burials in Vermont
19th-century American judges
19th-century American clergy